The 2022 CONIFA Women's World Football Cup was the first edition of the CONIFA Women's World Football Cup, an international football tournament for states, minorities, stateless peoples and regions unaffiliated with FIFA organised by CONIFA. It was cancelled following the COVID-19 pandemic and reorganised for July 2022.

Participants
The following teams were initially announced to participate in the tournament during CONIFA's Football Strategy event in Sabbioneta, Italy; 

  Tibet (Host)
  Sápmi

Withdrawn
After initially being announced as participants, some teams dropped out prior to kick off. Matabeleland reported issues with visas to participate, but no reason was given for Székely Land's withdrawal. No official statement was issued by CONIFA.

  Matabeleland
  Székely Land

Matches

Top scorers

8 Goals
 Moa Öhman

7 Goals
 Sandra Simonsen

3 Goals
 Karoline Fossli

1 Goal
 Ngawang Oetso
 Sofie Sorensen
 Emelie Kristiansen
 Klara Norlemann
 Wilma Ritzen

References

External links
 CONIFA Women World Football Cup 2022

International association football competitions hosted by India
2022 in Indian sport
2022 in association football
2022 in Indian women's sport
CONIFA